John Stone ( – 1704) was a Tory Member of Parliament serving two non-consecutive terms representing Wallingford. His first term was noted for his opposition to the Exclusion Bill. He likely did not stand for re-election in 1681; however, he ran again in 1685 and won; however, after that he never held office again.

References

English MPs 1679
English MPs 1680–1681
English MPs 1685–1687